Mian-Seh-Chal ( meaning in the middle of three holes) is a mountain in the Takht-e Suleyman Massif, Alborz mountain range, north of Iran.

See also
 List of Iranian four-thousanders

References

Mountains of Mazandaran Province
Mountains of Iran